Lacunicambarus ludovicianus, the painted devil crayfish, is a species of North American burrowing crayfish found in the Lower Mississippi drainage and in eastern and central Texas, Alabama, Kentucky, Missouri, and Oklahoma.

References

Cambaridae
Freshwater crustaceans of North America
Crustaceans described in 1884
Taxa named by Walter Faxon
Taxobox binomials not recognized by IUCN